The 2016 Vuelta a Burgos was a men's road bicycle race which was held from 2 August to 6 August 2016. It was the 38th edition of the Vuelta a Burgos stage race, which was established in 1946. The race was rated as a 2.HC event and forms part of the 2016 UCI Europe Tour. The race was made up of five stages including a team time trial. Alberto Contador of  won the race.

Teams
A total of 21 teams with 8 riders each will race in the 2016 Vuelta a Burgos: 13 UCI ProTeams, 6 UCI Professional Continental Teams and 2 UCI Continental Teams.

Route

Stages

Stage 1

Stage 2

Stage 3

Stage 4

Stage 5

Classification leadership

References

External links

2016
2016 UCI Europe Tour
2016 in Spanish road cycling
August 2016 sports events in Spain